The Districts of Yerevan refers to administrative divisions of Yerevan, the capital of Armenia.

Yerevan is divided into twelve "administrative districts" (վարչական շրջաններ), each with an elected community leader. Each district is divided into unofficial neighborhoods (թաղամասեր or թաղեր).

History

Persian and Russian eras

Main districts 

Since the 17th century, without the fortress and nearby villages (Noragyugh, Dzoragyugh and Nork), Yerevan was divided into three main quarters (mahlas): 
Shahar (The Old City),
Demir-Bulagh (Karahank)
Kond (Tapabash).
The market (Ghantar) was separate, between Kond and Shahar.

Shahar  
Shahar ( šahar) was the oldest and biggest quarter of Yerevan. It located in the north-eastern part of the city, between Amiryan St. and Khorenatsi St. It was, probably, populated since the Urartian times. During later centuries it was destroyed many times, but have always been populated. 
First time it was mentioned as old Yerevan or  the old city of Yerevan by bishop Pilipos of Bjni in 1631:

Kond

Kond, so-named because of its high position. It was also known as Tapabashi (Turkish: tepe - hill, baş - head, top; "top of the hill") during the Persian rule. Kond located in the western part of Yerevan. According to Hovhannes Shahkhatunyants, an Armenian historian, Kond located in the western and southern hillsides and foot of a rocky hill with similar name. Its western border was Hrazdan River, and the northern border was the Kozern Cemetery. Kond, similar to Shahar, was populated by Armenians. The population of Kond became multiethnic, when about 100 Armenian Boshas moved to Kond.

Demir-Bulagh 
The third main quarter was Demir-Bulagh (Turkish: "demir" - iron, "bulağ" - source, meaning "iron source"') or Karahank (meaning "rock quarry" referring to a quarry of tufa and basalt there). It located in the south-eastern Yerevan. This district was inhabited, comparatively, later than other districts. Firstly, a quarry located here and was not inhabited. Later, Karahank was inhabited with newcomer Tatars (Azerbaijanis) and became part of Yerevan forming a separate district. Demir-Bulagh become crowded in the 17th century, when terrified of the Persian invasions, many Turks from Nakhichevan moved to the areas north to the Yerevan Fortress. The majority of the population of the district were Muslims, few Armenians lived there.

Ghantar (the market) 
Ghantar belonged to the City Administration. Later, in place of Ghantar was built a close market and was called Ghantar. In 1938, the Children's Park (called Kirov Park during the Soviet era) was built in the place of Ghantar.

Expansion in the mid-19th century 

After Erivan was taken over by the Russian troops in 1827, many Armenians from northern Persia came to Eastern Armenia, including to Yerevan. The city was expanded. 
In the mid-19th century Yerevan had 6 districts: 
Shahar
Kond
Demir-Bulagh
Dzoragyugh
Nor tagh
Shen tagh
Nork

Yerevan has been expanded at the expense of two surrounding villages: Dzoragyugh and Nork.

Dzoragyugh 
Dzoragyugh (Dara-kend in Turkish and Azerbaijani) was a suburb and later a district of Yerevan. It located in the Hrazdan gorge, in the left steep coast. 
During the Persian rule it was officially translated as Dara-kend.
According to Zakaria Sarkavag this village -  which before becoming a district of Yerevan was a separate village - was called Khnkelo dzor. 
According to Simeon I of Yerevan this village was called with two names: Dzoragyugh and Khnkadzor.
The Surb Sargis Church located in Dzoragygh and commonly was called the Church of Dzoragyugh.
Dzoragyugh was called Khnkadzor or Khnkelo, because it was Yerevan's bishop's seat, the word "khunk" means 'incense' in Armenian. 
The population of Dzoragyugh was completely Armenian. Dzoragyugh had three smaller neighborhoods: 
Verin tagh (Վերին թաղ, "Upper district") or Karapi tagh (Քարափի թաղ, "The Bluff district") located on the left upland of Hrazdan, north-west from the fortress, in the surrounding area of the St. Sargis church.
Storin tagh (Ստորին թաղ, "Lower district") or Dzori tagh (Ձորի թաղ, "The Gorge district") located on the left side of Hrazdan, in a precipitous gorge.
The district of Karbi (Կարբիի թաղ) was, probably, the southern continuation of Storin tagh. Many people from Karbi village of Ashtarak lived there.

Nork 
Nork (meaning "potter") was the second villages near Yerevan, that became its part in the 1830s. Because the pottery was common labor, the Turks called it Cholmakci (Çömlekçi). The population was completely Armenian. They were working in agriculture, vegetable-growing, farming, and pottery. There were smaller districts (mahlans) in Nork, too. Though Nork was inhabited since ancient times, but it was mentioned comparatively late. There were two churches in Nork: Surb Astvatsatsin and Surb Simeon Tseruni (19th century).

And other two new districts were built: Nor tagh and Shen tagh.

Nor tagh 
Nor tagh (meaning “new district”) located in the eastern part of Kond, in the surrounding are of the Hovhannes Tumanyan House-Museum. It was called ‘new’, because many immigrants from Atropatene were moved here after the 1828 Treaty of Turkmenchay. During the Persian rule, in the place of the Nor tagh were the Gardens of the Sardars, called Khanlubagh

Shen tagh 
Shen tagh located in the surrounding areas of the English Park.

Soviet era

Note: for the names of raions the Russian names are given, which was official at the time.
The first administrative division of Yerevan took place in 1936. Two raions were formed:
Kirov raion (Кировский район)
Stalin raion (Сталинский район)

The Spandaryan raion (Спандарянский район) was formed in 1938 and the Molotov raion (Молотовский район) in 1939.
As of 1940 Yerevan had 4 raions:
Kirov raion (Кировский район)
Molotov raion (Молотовский район)
Spandaryan raion (Спандарянский район)
Stalin raion (Сталинский район)

The Kirov raion was disintegrated in 1953. In 1957, the Molotov raion was renamed as Lenin raion. In 1958, Shahumyan raion was formed, followed by the Ordzhonikidze raion in 1961. So as of 1971 there were 6 raions in Yerevan:
26 Commissars raion (Район им.26 Комиссаров)
Lenin raion (Ленинский район)
Myasnikyan raion (Мясникянский район)
Shahumyan raion (Шаумянский район)
Spandaryan raion (Спандарянский район)
Ordzhonikidze raion (Орджоникидзевский район)

The Soviet raion (Советский район) was formed in 1972, followed by the Mashtots raion (Маштоцкий район) in 1986.

Raions of Yerevan and their populations according to the last Soviet census of 1989:

See also 
 History of Yerevan
 Yerevan
 Erebuni Fortress
 Armenian Oblast
 Erivan Governorate
 Khanate of Erevan
 History of Armenia

References 

Albert Parsadanyan. Intelligence Warehouse-2. Yerevan, VMV-Print, 2005, p. 150-152.
 Կամսար Ավետիսյան. ՀԱՅՐԵՆԱԳԻՏԱԿԱՆ ԷՏՅՈՒԴՆԵՐ - ԵՐԵՎԱՆԻ ՄԻԿՐՈՏՈՊՈՆԻՄԻԿԱՆ. Երևան, «Սովետական գրող» հրատարակչություն, 1979
 Կամսար Ավետիսյան. ՀԱՅՐԵՆԱԳԻՏԱԿԱՆ ԷՏՅՈՒԴՆԵՐ - ՀԱՅՐԵՆԻՔՈԻՄ ՎԵՐԱՀԱՍՏԱՏՎԱԾ ՏԵՂԱՆՈՒՆՆԵՐ. Երևան, «Սովետական գրող» հրատարակչություն, 1979

External links